Namori Meite (born February 25, 1988 in Paris) is a French-born Côte d'Ivoirean basketball player currently playing for ALM Évreux Basket of the French Ligue Nationale de Basketball Division B. He is also a member of the Côte d'Ivoire national basketball team.

Meite competed as a member of the Côte d'Ivoire national basketball team for the first time at the 2009 FIBA Africa Championship.  He saw action in all nine games for the Ivorians, who won the silver medal to qualify for the 2010 FIBA World Championship.

References

External links
LNB profile

1988 births
Living people
Centers (basketball)
French men's basketball players
French sportspeople of Ivorian descent
Ivorian men's basketball players
Metropolitans 92 players
Basketball players from Paris